Bootlegs & G-Sides, Vol. 2 was the fifth album released by rap group, 11/5. It was released on October 31, 2000 for Dogday and was produced by Ant Banks, Funk Daddy and Dush Tray. The album was a sequel to the original Bootlegs & G-Sides, but unlike the original, which featured various accomplished Bay Area rappers, this album featured more independent and unknown rappers.

Track listing
"Tryin 2 Make Endz" - 3:46 
"$, Murder and Sex" - 3:55 
"Give It Up" - 5:08 
"Loc-N-Load" - 4:30 
"No Equals" - 3:16 
"Weed Money" - 4:25 
"Bad News" - 2:40 
"Upz and Downz" - 3:48 
"18 + 1" - 4:37 
"Hoez Ain't Shit" - 4:23 
"Roll 'Em Up" - 3:22 
"So Sick" - 3:54 
"Get on Up" - 4:00 
"Bay Love" - 4:20 
"Projection" - 4:26

11/5 albums
Albums produced by Ant Banks
2000 compilation albums